Pipsqueaks is an Australian pre-school puppet series airing on Seven's digital channel 7TWO. Directed by Ian Munro, it premiered on 30 October 2013.

Cast 
 Sassy - Emma De Vries
 Squidge - Adam Kronenberg
 Peppy - Dash Kruck
 Poppy - Anna Straker

References

7two original programming
Australian children's television series
2010s Australian television series
2013 Australian television series debuts
Australian television shows featuring puppetry
English-language television shows
Australian preschool education television series
Television series by Beyond Television Productions